

Events
United States
The Black Hand led by Sam Cardinelli begin years of setting off over eight hundred bombs, killing over twenty people and wounding hundreds more until 1918 when they are convicted of murder and hanged.
Benjamin Snyder, an associate of New York labor racketeer Joseph "Greasy Joe" Rosenzweig, is convicted of murder and sentenced to twenty years' imprisonment
Peter H. Matthews is arrested, tried, and jailed for operating policy games throughout New York City.
Steve Wallace, with his brothers Frank and Jimmy Wallace of the Gustin Gang, begin hijacking and looting trucks in Southie often stripping cargo from the rear of the truck while stopped at intersections. The brothers are soon known by the press as the "Tailboard Thieves".
Al Capone joins the James Street Gang under Johnny Torrio, a satellite of the Five Points Gang.
March 12 – Frank Costello is arrested for carrying a concealed weapons after detectives receive information from an informant. Costello is sentenced to one year in Welfare Island prison by Judge Edward Swann and is released after ten months.
May 17 – Giosue Gallucci, also known as the undisputed King of Little Italy who controlled the policy game in Italian Harlem (New York City) is shot together with his son. He died four days later.
July 15 – New York police lieutenant Charles Becker is convicted of planning the murder of police informant Herman "Beansie" Rosenthal by the Lenox Avenue Gang in 1912 and executed at Sing Sing Prison.

Japan
The Yamaguchi-gumi organization begins operating in Japan.

Arts and literature
Sidney M. Goldin's The Last of the Mafia is released starring Jack J. Clark, William Conrad and Katherine Lee.

Births
Salvatore Santoro "Tom Mix", Lucchese crime family mobster
March 15 – Mario Anthony DeStefano, Chicago Outfit member
June 20 – Paul Castellano "Big Paul", Gambino crime family Don
November 15 – Santo Trafficante Jr., Tampa Mafia Don

References 

Organized crime
Years in organized crime